Steven William Baack (born November 16, 1960) is a former professional American football player who played defensive lineman for five seasons for the Detroit Lions. He was the 75th pick of the third round in the 1984 draft and one of several NFL players who were able to play multiple positions as roster athletes in the NFL in those years.

References

1960 births
American football defensive linemen
Detroit Lions players
Oregon Ducks football players
Living people
Sportspeople from Ames, Iowa